Victor Herbert Crowe (31 January 1932 – 21 January 2009) was a Wales international football player and later football manager.

Career
Crowe was born in Abercynon, South Wales but moved to Handsworth, Birmingham with his family when he was two years old. On leaving school, he played for Erdington Albion, the West Bromwich Albion nursery team, but signed for Aston Villa in 1951 and would spend most of his career with the Birmingham club. He established himself in the Villa team when Danny Blanchflower vacated the right-half berth in 1954. He missed the 1957 FA Cup Final due to injury but captained the side to the Second Division title in 1960 and League Cup Final success in 1961. He was capped 16 times by Wales.

As manager, Crowe was unable to prevent Villa being relegated when he took charge towards the end of the 1969–70 season. The following season he led his Third Division team to the League Cup Final against Tottenham Hotspur, which Villa lost. He saw his side finish top of Division Three in 1972, however, breaking many records along the way. He was sacked in 1974 after his side finished 14th in Division Two.

In 1975, Crowe went to the United States to take part in the North American Soccer League, taking the manager's position with Portland Timbers. He brought a cast of English players with him, many of them young players from the Midlands area, and they proceeded to win the Western Division championship and advanced all the way to the NASL final, losing 2–0 to Tampa Bay Rowdies. In their two home playoff games, "The Lads" success forced the club to add temporary seating to accommodate their fans, and the team played before two crowds in excess of 30,000, totals unheard of in American soccer at the time.

Crowe stayed in Portland through the 1976 season before returning to England. The Timbers beckoned again in 1980, however, and he returned for three more seasons in America before the Timbers club folded after the 1982 season. Although his later teams never captured the success of that first year, he left an indelible mark on soccer in the Pacific Northwest by introducing thousands of Portland area residents to the joys of the game. Today, Portland is a soccer hotbed. In 2001 the Timbers re-emerged as a member of the professional USL First Division, and in 2011 Portland moved into the highest tier of American soccer by joining Major League Soccer. The modern edition of the Timbers play in the same stadium where Crowe and his lads excelled that first year in 1975.

Crowe died on 21 January 2009, at the age of 76, after a long illness.

References

1932 births
2009 deaths
People from Abercynon
Sportspeople from Rhondda Cynon Taf
Welsh footballers
Welsh expatriate footballers
Wales international footballers
Aston Villa F.C. players
Peterborough United F.C. players
Welsh football managers
Aston Villa F.C. managers
1958 FIFA World Cup players
National Professional Soccer League (1967) players
North American Soccer League (1968–1984) players
Atlanta Chiefs players
Expatriate soccer players in the United States
Welsh expatriate sportspeople in the United States
Portland Timbers (NASL) coaches
North American Soccer League (1968–1984) coaches
Expatriate soccer managers in the United States
Association football wing halves
Footballers from Handsworth, West Midlands